Lemurella is a genus of flowering plants from the orchid family, Orchidaceae. It contains 4 currently recognized species (as of June 2014), native to Madagascar and to the Comoro Islands.

Lemurella culicifera (Rchb.f.) H.Perrier
Lemurella pallidiflora Bosser
Lemurella papillosa Bosser
Lemurella virescens H.Perrier

References 

  (1925) Repertorium Specierum Novarum Regni Vegetabilis, Beihefte 33: 367.
  2005. Handbuch der Orchideen-Namen. Dictionary of Orchid Names. Dizionario dei nomi delle orchidee. Ulmer, Stuttgart
  (Eds) (2014) Genera Orchidacearum Volume 6: Epidendroideae (Part 3); page 399 ff., Oxford: Oxford University Press.

External links 

Vandeae genera
Angraecinae